
Gmina Korfantów is an urban-rural gmina (administrative district) in Nysa County, Opole Voivodeship, in south-western Poland.

Villages
Apart from the town of Korfantów, Gmina Korfantów contains the villages and settlements of Borek, Gryżów, Jegielnica, Kuropas, Kuźnica Ligocka, Myszowice, Niesiebędowice, Piechocice, Pleśnica, Przechód, Przydroże Małe, Przydroże Wielkie, Puszyna, Rączka, Rynarcice, Rzymkowice, Ścinawa Mała, Ścinawa Nyska, Stara Jamka, Węża, Wielkie Łąki, Włodary and Włostowa.

Neighbouring gminas
Gmina Korfantów is bordered by the gminas of Biała, Łambinowice, Nysa, Prószków, Prudnik and Tułowice.

Twin towns – sister cities

Gmina Korfantów is twinned with:

 Boulleret, France
 Debrzno, Poland
 Friedland, Brandenburg, Germany
 Friedland, Lower Saxony, Germany
 Friedland, Mecklenburg-Vorpommern, Germany
 Frýdlant, Czech Republic
 Frýdlant nad Ostravicí, Czech Republic
 Mieroszów, Poland
 Mirosławiec, Poland
 Pravdinsk, Russia

References

Korfantow
Nysa County